Asco or ASCO may refer to:
 Asco, Haute-Corse, France, a commune
 Asco (river), a river in Haute-Corse, France
 Ascó, a village in Catalonia, Spain
 Ascó Nuclear Power Plant
 Asco (art collective), an East Los Angeles-based artist group
 American Society of Clinical Oncology
 Arab Satellite Communications Organization
 ASCO Numatics, a brand or acquisition of Emerson Electric
 AirScooter Corporation's ticker symbol
 Asco (meteorite), a meteorite fall in 1805 on the island of Corsica, France
 AS Chaudière-Ouest, a Canadian soccer team
 Asian small-clawed otter